"Hows Chances?" is a popular song written by Irving Berlin for the 1933 musical As Thousands Cheer where it was introduced by Marilyn Miller and Clifton Webb.  In the musical, it is used in a sketch based on a newspaper headline "Joan Crawford to Divorce Douglas Fairbanks, Jr." with Marilyn Miller portraying Joan Crawford and Clifton Webb acting as Douglas Fairbanks Jr.

Notable recordings
Clifton Webb, with Leo Reisman's Ochestra, recorded on October 3, 1933 for Victor (No. 24418B).
Paul Whiteman included an orchestral version on his picture disc recording for RCA-Victor (No. 39003) in 1933.
Ella Fitzgerald - Ella Fitzgerald Sings the Irving Berlin Songbook (1958)

References

Songs written by Irving Berlin
Songs from As Thousands Cheer
1933 songs